Murat Yakshiyev (born 12 January 1992) is a professional Turkmen football player who played in Şagadam. He is also a member of Turkmenistan national football team.

Club career 
He was born in Turkmenabat, Turkmenistan, and started his career in football team FC Bagtyyarlyk-Lebap in Turkmenabat.

In 2014, he moved to the professional football by signing a contract with the Turan FK. However, in the third round of the Ýokary Liga he moved to Balkan FK. Speaking for the Balkan FK in the 2015 season became the top scorer of the Ýokary Liga (31 goals), as well as the silver medalist of the championship.

Since 2016 plays for FC Altyn Asyr. He made his debut for the new club in the framework of the 2016 AFC Cup against the Lebanese club Al-Ahed (2:0). As part of FC Altyn Asyr, he became the champion of the Turkmenistan for four years in a row.

In January 2020, he joined the Ýokary Liga vice-champion FC Ahal.

International career 
Ýagşyýew made his senior national team debut on 26 March 2017 against Chinese Taipei, coming to the substitution at the 72nd minute.

International goals
Scores and results list Turkmenistan's goal tally first.

References

External links
 

Living people
1992 births
Turkmenistan footballers
Association football forwards
Turkmenistan international footballers
People from Türkmenabat
FC Altyn Asyr players
FC Ahal players
2019 AFC Asian Cup players